Gordon J. MacDonald (born November 27, 1961) is an American attorney who has served as the chief justice of the New Hampshire Supreme Court since 2021. He previously served as the 30th Attorney General of New Hampshire from 2017 to 2021.

Education and early career
MacDonald attended public schools in Hanover, New Hampshire, graduating from Hanover High School. He earned a 
Bachelor of Arts in government, cum laude, from Dartmouth College in 1983.

From 1985 to 1990, MacDonald worked as legislative director for United States Senator Gordon J. Humphrey. In 1990, he became Humphrey’s Chief of Staff.

Legal education and career
In 1994, MacDonald earned a juris doctor, magna cum laude, from Cornell Law School. At Cornell, he worked as an article editor for the Cornell Law Review and was a member of the Order of the Coif. 
 
From 1994 to 1995, MacDonald clerked for judge Norman H. Stahl of the United States Court of Appeals for the First Circuit.

In 1995, MacDonald became an associate in the litigation department of Hale and Door LLP in Boston. In 1997, he became an associate at Nelson, Kinder, Mosseau & Gordon, PC in Manchester, New Hampshire. In 2001, he became an associate in the litigation department of Nixon Peabody, also in Manchester. In 2005, he became a partner in the same department of Nixon Peabody, holding that role until his appointment as attorney general.

From 2004 to 2017, MacDonald served on the New Hampshire Supreme Court Board of Bar Examiners, chairing the board from 2010 to 2017.

In 2017, MacDonald was nominated to be New Hampshire Attorney General by newly elected governor Chris Sununu. He was unanimously confirmed by the Executive Council of New Hampshire.

New Hampshire Supreme Court
On June 4, 2019, Governor Sununu nominated MacDonald to be Chief Justice of the New Hampshire Supreme Court, replacing Robert J. Lynn who faced mandatory retirement at age 70. On July 10, 2019, the Democratic-controlled executive council rejected MacDonald’s nomination by a 3-2 party-line vote. Democratic Councilors accused him of being a partisan and radical conservative. MacDonald denied the accusations, pointing to the support for his nomination from prominent Democrats including former Chief Justice John T. Broderick.

On January 22, 2021, after Republicans flipped the council in the 2020 elections, Sununu renominated MacDonald, and his nomination was confirmed by a 4–1 party-line vote. He was sworn into office on March 4, 2021, succeeding acting Chief Justice Gary E. Hicks.

Personal life
MacDonald is married to fellow attorney Jennifer Eber, with whom he has one daughter.  MacDonald lives with his family in Deering, New Hampshire.

References

External links
Gordon MacDonald Application to Serve as Associate Justice (Source: New Hampshire Public Radio)

|-

1961 births
Living people
Chief Justices of the New Hampshire Supreme Court
Cornell Law School alumni
Dartmouth College alumni
Politicians from Los Angeles
New Hampshire Attorneys General
New Hampshire Republicans
United States congressional aides